Dance Dance Revolution Extreme has a robust soundtrack. It includes many licensed tracks as well as in-house original music that was written and performed by Konami staff.

Lists of songs

Arcade (240 songs)
The arcade release of Dance Dance Revolution Extreme contains 80 new songs of 240 total, including 11 Club Version songs and three Dancing Stage EuroMix 2 songs. Most of the other new songs are revivals from previous Bemani games. Songs that are not initially available for play are represented with a padlock icon and are only accessible through the use of codes entered into the game's operator menu. The song "Legend of Max" appears on the end credits when the songs are locked.

Most of the songs featured in Extreme returned in subsequent arcade releases:
 Dance Dance Revolution SuperNova features 184 songs from Extreme.
 Dance Dance Revolution SuperNova 2 features 176 songs from Extreme.
 Dance Dance Revolution A and newer feature 147 songs from Extreme.

In SuperNova, the 56 removed songs were 51 licenses and 5 Bemani crossovers. SuperNova 2 introduced a DDR Extreme folder. In Dance Dance Revolution X, songs are divided by mix (1st to Extreme) instead of using a single Extreme folder, a feature maintained in all releases to this day.

Legend:
 🎬 This song features a unique game video in Dance Dance Revolution Extreme 2 for the PlayStation 2.

PlayStation 2
The PlayStation 2 release of Dance Dance Revolution Extreme contains 111 songs. In the same vein as the arcade release, the PlayStation 2 release contains a number of popular songs from past games which is uncommon in Japanese console releases. New to the series songs are in green, songs from other Bemani series are in yellow, songs originally from console DDR games, DDR Solo, and DDR 2ndMix Club Version are in purple, songs from previous DDR games are in blue, and Boss songs are in red. New Konami Originals that are not on the arcade soundtrack receive special coloring: DDR Originals are in pink, while BEMANI crossover songs are in orange. Songs that are not initially available are represented with a padlock icon and require certain conditions in-game to be met before they can be played.

Lists of courses

Nonstop
Dance Dance Revolution Extreme reintroduced Nonstop courses for the first time since Dance Dance Revolution 4thMix Plus, with some improvements: the ability to select between two levels of difficulty, and the ability to use modifiers during the course. However, it is no longer possible to use a memory card to customize the song list and order of Nonstop courses. Some Nonstop courses use data collected by the game to determine the songs they contain, while others select songs at random. All Nonstop courses have four songs that are played back to back without rest between them, and use the standard life bar as in normal gameplay.

Notes:
 🕹️ indicates that the course is available on the Japanese PlayStation 2 version.
 In the arcade version, all six Player's courses and all four Random courses may feature Challenge steps instead of Standard or Heavy steps, when Challenge-only songs are featured in a course.

The PlayStation 2 version features 12 courses that are identical to the arcade version. Additionally, two courses on the PlayStation 2 replace one song compared to their arcade counterparts:
  (Four Seasons) features "Can't Stop Fallin' In Love (Speed Mix)" instead of "Firefly".
 Euro Beat features "Burnin' the Floor (Momo Mix)" instead of "Nori Nori Nori".

Challenge (arcade)
The Nonstop Challenge mode from DDRMAX2 Dance Dance Revolution 7thMix returns in Extreme, with its name simplified to Challenge. As before, each player begins with four lives, though the battery only depicts three. Upon breaking a combo (with a Good, Almost or Boo step) or failing to complete a freeze arrow, one life is depleted. Some songs will replenish a life or two after completion. Extreme exchanges the percentage meter with a points meter to determine a player's score. Some Challenge courses contain forced modifiers, listed after the song title in bold. New Challenge courses are in green, yellow and purple, while boss courses are in red.

Extreme features 26 Challenge courses, including eight from DDRMAX2. SuperNova and SuperNova 2 feature five courses from DDRMAX2 (Love RevenG, plus four courses common to Extreme) and five courses from Extreme.
In Dance Dance Revolution SuperNova

PlayStation 2
The following Challenge courses from the arcade version return on the PlayStation 2 version:

 Naoki Neo-Standard
 Paranoia Brothers
 Paranoia Brothers (MAX2)
 Trip Five
 From GF&DM
 Naoki Premium
  (Real Ghost Road) 

Period" as the final song in Expert and Challenge difficulty, respectively.

The following Challenge courses for the PlayStation 2 remove songs compared to their arcade counterparts:
 Classic: "End of the Century" and "Saints Go Marching (Remix)" are absent.
 World Tour: "Living in America", "Orion.78 (Ameuro-Mix)" and "Matsuri Japan" are absent.
 IIDX Boss: "DXY!" is absent.

New songs

Konami Original
Dance Dance Revolution Extreme features 15 new Konami originals. Most songs reappear in subsequent arcade releases, including Dance Dance Revolution A, with a few exceptions: the licensed "BURNIN' THE FLOOR (MOMO MIX)" is dropped after Extreme, "CRASH!" and "Memories" make their final appearance in Dance Dance Revolution SuperNova 2 and a few songs ("GRADUATION ~それぞれの明日", "LOVE♥SHINE" and "TEARS") were removed from the final release of Dance Dance Revolution X, only to be revived in Dance Dance Revolution X2 and subsequent games. The five latter songs did appear in the DDR X location test, with new level ratings.

1998
"1998" is a song by NAOKI. The song's title refers to the year DDR was first invented, 1998. The style of the song is similar other rave songs composed by Naoki, such as BRILLIANT 2U and B4U. A remix of the song titled "Be Rock U (1998 burst style)", appeared in beatmaniaIIDX 9th Style.

bag
"bag" is a song by RevenG. RevenG is a pseudonym of Naoki Maeda, who frequently used it for his exotic-themed songs. The song's BPM is originally 130, but the chart of the song is intentionally slowed down to half of that, 65 BPM, making it very hard to read at normal speed. The song's original BPM was restored for its charts when the song was transplanted to beatmaniaIIDX 9th Style.

BURNIN' THE FLOOR (MOMO MIX)
"BURNIN' THE FLOOR (MOMO MIX)" is a song by Naoki. While this song is a remix of a Konami Original song, it is actually a license, which came from the "Dancemania SPEED" series, a sub-series of Dancemania, a source for most of DDR licenses. This remix is exclusive to Extreme, despite the remix licenses from DDRMAX2 (such as "B4U (B4 ZA BEAT MIX)" and "BRILLIANT 2U (K.O.G G3 MIX)") being kept in future DDR games. Originally composed by Naoki Maeda, this song is remixed by Toshiba-EMI employer Akira Kanazawa.

CRASH!
"CRASH!" is a song by mr. BRIAN & THE FINAL BAND. The song first appeared in the European Dancing Stage EuroMix 2, which was released several months before DDR Extreme. THE FINAL BAND is a pseudonym of Naoki Maeda, while mr. BRIAN is apparently the vocalist.

Dance Dance Revolution
"Dance Dance Revolution" is a song by DDR ALL STARS. The song is a tribute to the series, as the song itself is actually a remix of the opening theme of the very first DDR and DDR 2ndMix. The song also has a dedicated background video which is a footage of the opening movies from older DDR games, from the first DDR up to DDR 4thMix. Naoki Maeda composed this song, while DDR ALL STARS is a pseudonym of several long-time DDR vocalists, such as Paula Terry and Aaron G..

GRADUATION ~それぞれの明日~
"GRADUATION ~それぞれの明日" is a song by BeForU. The subtitle, "Sorezore no Ashita" means "For Each Tomorrow". Both the song title and the subtitle carries a hidden meaning (as yet another sign of the end of DDR at that time) in that although the DDR must "graduate" after four years (a reference to "GRADUATION"), it has brought a positive impact to everyone for many years to come (a reference to "For Each Tomorrow"). The song is composed by Naoki Maeda with J-Pop group "BeForU" as the vocalists.

Hyper eurobeat
"HYPER EUROBEAT" is a song by NAOKI feat. DDR ALL STARS. As the title suggest, the genre of the song is Hyper Eurobeat. The song is infamous for being slightly offbeat, making it harder to score perfectly. Naoki Maeda composed this song, while DDR ALL STARS is pseudonym for several long-time DDR vocalists such as Paula Terry.

LOVE♥SHINE
"LOVE♥SHINE" is a song by 小坂りゆ. The song is composed by Naoki Maeda, with the leader of the J-Pop group BeForU, Riyu Kosaka as the vocalist.

Memories
"MEMORIES" is a Trance song by NAOKI feat. PAULA TERRY. Alongside CRASH! and VANITY ANGEL, this song first appeared in the European Dancing Stage EuroMix 2, which was released several months before DDR Extreme. Naoki Maeda composed this song, with the Australian singer Paula Terry as the vocalist.

PARANOiA Survivor
"PARANOiA Survivor" is a song by 270. The song is another remix of "PARANOiA", a song originally from the first DDR. This song has a dedicated background video which shows the creation of DDR arcade machines. As a theme of sorts, 270 is a pseudonym of Naoki Maeda which signify the maximum BPM of the song.

PARANOiA Survivor MAX
"PARANOiA Survivor MAX" is a song by 290. The song is a faster remix of "PARANOiA Survivor", with added instrumental at the end of the song. The Challenge stepchart of the song is considered one the hardest stepcharts in DDR history at that point, which was proven as the chart is the only DDR Extreme song that is rated a 16 using the new X-Scale rating. As with the original, the song is composed by Naoki Maeda, with 290 signifying the maximum BPM of the song.

The legend of MAX
"The legend of MAX" is a song by ZZ. The song is considered as a spiritual successor to both "MAX 300" and "MAXX Unlimited", as the song has a similar title and borrows the style of those songs heavily. For some time, the song had the fastest constant and maximum BPM, as it has a constant BPM of 333 and reaches 666 at one point. The Heavy stepcharts of the song are also rated a "flashing 10", which were used for few songs that are considered harder than a normal 10. The song is composed by Naoki Maeda, like its predecessors.

Vanity angel
"VANITY ANGEL" is an Atmospheric Euro-Trance song by FIXX. The song first appeared in the European Dancing Stage EuroMix 2 that was released several months before this game. FIXX is a collaboration between Naoki Maeda and fellow BEMANI composer Taku Sakakibara (better known as TaQ).

Tears
"TEARS" is a Japanese-Trance song by NAOKI underground feat. EK. NAOKI underground is a pseudonym of Naoki Maeda, which is frequently used for his trance songs, while EK is a pseudonym of Noria Shiraishi, a member of J-Pop group BeForU.

TRIP MACHINE Survivor
"TRIP MACHINE Survivor" is a song by DE-SIRE. This song is yet another remix of "TRIP MACHINE", first appeared in the first DDR game. The song is a medley of sorts, as it combines all elements from previous TRIP MACHINE songs. Like other TRIP MACHINE songs, this song is composed by Naoki Maeda.

BEMANI crossovers

321Stars
"321STARS" is a song by DJ SIMON. This song is a crossover from beatmania completeMix 2 and was composed by Sugimoto Kiyotaka. The song title refers to the composer's birthday, 21 March.

A
"A" is a song by D.J.Amuro. The song is a crossover from beatmaniaIIDX 7th Style and was composed by one of beatmaniaIIDX frequent contributors Takayuki Ishikawa. The song's title is spelled "Ace" and seems to be based around trump cards as the song's overlay in beatmaniaIIDX features a joker which was carried over as the song's background in this game. The version of the song in this game is a shortened version of the original, mostly cutting the parts in the middle.

A Stupid Barber
"A Stupid Barber" is a song by Sho-T.

Across the nightmare
"Across the nightmare" is a song by Jimmy Weckl. The song is a crossover from the original Drummania and was composed by GuitarFreaks/Drummania composer Harumi Ueko.

air
"air" is a song by DJ SIMON. The song is a crossover from beatmania 6thMix and composed by Sugimoto Kiyotaka.

蒼い衝動 ~for EXTREME~
"蒼い衝動 ~for EXTREME " is a Japanese-Trance song by NAOKI feat. YUKI. The song is a crossover from beatmaniaIIDX 8th Style, composed by Naoki Maeda and sung by Miyuki Kunitake. The subtitle "for EXTREME" signify that this song is a shortened and slightly rearranged version of the original. 蒼い衝動 means Blue Impulse.

Be lovin
"BE LOVIN" is a song by D-Crew. The song is a crossover from beatmania 7thMix and was composed by Osamu Migitera.

Colors ~for EXTREME~
"Colors ~for EXTREME~" is a song by dj TAKA. The song is a crossover from beatmaniaIIDX 6th Style, composed by Takayuki Ishikawa and sung by American vocalist Sunny James (under the alias CHIYOKO in the credits). The "for EXTREME" subtitle signify that this song is a shortened and slightly rearranged version of the original, "radio edit" version.

大見解
"大見解" is a song by Des-ROW feat. TSUBOI for ALPHA. The song is one of the first four crossovers from the fellow BEMANI series pop'n music, originally appearing in pop'n music 6. The song title is spelled "Daikenkai", which means "Big Opinion". The song is composed by Osamu Migitera (Des-ROW) and sung by ALPHA. The version used in this game is a shortened version of the original. The pop'n music character 六 made appearance in the banner and video of this song.

Destiny lovers
"Destiny lovers" is a song by くにたけ みゆき. The song is one of the first crossovers from fellow BEMANI series GuitarFreaks and Drummania, originally appearing in GuitarFreaks 7thMix / Drummania 6thMix. The song is composed by Mutsuhiko Izumi, while the vocals are sung by Miyuki Kunitake.

feeling of love
"feeling of love" is a song by youhei shimizu. The song is one of the few crossovers from the now-defunct beatmania spin-off beatmaniaIII, composed by Youhei Shimizu (who is the sound director of beatmaniaIII) and sung by American vocalist Argie Phine.

Frozen Ray ~for EXTREME~
"Frozen Ray ~for EXTREME~" is a song by dj TAKA. The song is one of the two only BEMANI crossovers from the now-defunct Keyboardmania series, originally appearing in Keyboardmania 3rdMix and composed by Takayuki Ishikawa. The "for EXTREME" subtitle signify that this version is a rearranged version of the original, based on the OST version of the song.

Gamelan de Couple
"Gamelan de Couple" is a song by TOMOSUKE. The song is one of the two only BEMANI crossovers from the one-shot Mambo a Go Go. The song is composed by Tomosuke Funaki, a BEMANI artist known for his works in a variety of BEMANI games.

Happy Wedding
"Happy Wedding" is a song by ASKA. The song is a crossover from beatmaniaIIDX 7th Style, composed by Takayuki Ishikawa and sung by ASKA.

Heaven is a '57 metallic gray ~gimmix~
"Heaven is a '57 metallic gray ~gimmix~" is a song by Hiro feat. Sweet little 30's. The song originally appeared in Drummania, composed by Hideyuki Ono and sung by long-time BEMANI vocalist Thomas Howard Lichtenstein. However, the version of the song used in this game is actually the Dance ManiaX version, which is a remixed version rearranged by Kazuhiro Senoo (explaining the "gimmix" subtitle).

Hold on Me
"Hold on Me" is a song by Tiger Yamato.

I Do I Do I Do
"I Do I Do I Do" is a song by Creamy.

I'm gonna get you!
"I'm gonna get you!" is a song by Kelly Cosmo. The song is a crossover from GuitarFreaks 4th Mix / Drummania 3rdMix, composed by Kazuhiro Senoo and sung by Kelly Cosmo.

Irresistiblement
"Irresistiblement" is a song by Wildside.

jane jana
"jane jana" is a song by T.E.M.P.O. feat. Mohammed & Emi. The song is a crossover from Dance ManiaX, composed by Tomosuke Funaki and sung by Mohammed & Emi.

Jet world
"JET WORLD" is a song by Mutsuhiko Izumi. The song is a crossover from GuitarFreaks 2ndMix.

Kiss kiss kiss
"KISS KISS KISS" is a song by NAOKI feat. SHANTI. The song is a crossover from Dance ManiaX 2ndMix, composed by Naoki Maeda and sung by SHANTI.

Kiss me all night long
"Kiss me all night long" is a song by NAOKI J-STYLE feat. MIU. The song is a crossover from Dance ManiaX 2ndMix, composed by Naoki Maeda and sung by Miyuki Kunitake.

L'amour et la liberté (DDR ver.)
"L'amour et la liberté (DDR ver.)" is a Sad trance song by NAOKI underground. The song is a crossover from beatmaniaIIDX 6th Style, composed by Naoki Maeda under the alias NAOKI underground (who frequently used it for his trance songs), while the vocals are done by Paula Terry. The song title is French for "The Love and Freedom". The subtitle, "DDR ver.", signify that this song is a shorter and slightly rearranged version of the original.

La Bamba
"LA BAMBA" is a song by メキシコ民謡. The song is a public domain song first appeared in the one-shot Mambo a Go Go that is based on the traditional Mexican folk song frequently played during weddings. This is reflected by the artist's name, which roughly means "Mexican Folk Song"). This song is set at 179 BPM and has a length of 1:32.

Dance Dance Revolution SuperNova features a different version of "La Bamba" by LH MUSIC CREATION. It has a slower tempo at 156 BPM and is ten seconds longer. It is the only SuperNova license to be included in every subsequent arcade release, including the current title, Dance Dance Revolution A.

La Copa de la Vida
"La Copa de la Vida" is a song by Patrick Victorio.

Last Message
"Last Message" is a song by good-cool feat. Meg. The song is a crossover from beatmaniaIIDX 7th Style, composed by outside artist Tatsuya Furukawa and sung by Meg. The music video of the song, present in IIDX but not DDR, is infamous for its three-second cleavage shots that are considered distracting. Unlike most other BEMANI crossovers, this song requires an operator unlock code, and it was retired after this game.

♥Love²シュガ→♥
"♥Love²シュガ→♥" is a song by dj TAKA feat. のりあ. The song is one of the first crossovers from the pop'n music series, originally appearing in pop'n music 8. The song is composed by Takayuki Ishikawa and sung by Noria Shiraishi, a member of J-Pop group BeForU. The banner, background, and video feature MILK, the pop'n music character of this song. The song is known as Love Love Sugar in any North American/European release.

魔法の扉 (スペース☆マコのテーマ)
"魔法の扉 (スペース☆マコのテーマ)" is a song by a.s.a.. The song is a crossover from the one-shot spin-off of pop'n music, pop'n stage, composed by Sugimoto Kiyotaka and sung by Yuko Asai. The song's title roughly translated to "Magic Door (Space Maco's Theme)". The pop'n music character, SPACE MACO appeared in the song banner and background.

Max. (Period)
"Max. (Period)" is a song by 2MB.

三毛猫ロック
"三毛猫ロック" is a song by 亜熱帯マジ-SKA爆弾. The song is originally an Extra Stage song crossover from GuitarFreaks 8thMix / Drummania 7thMix, composed by several BEMANI artists under the alias "Anettai Maji-Ska Bakudan"; Hideyuki Ono, Mutsuhiko Izumi, Yoshihiko Koezuka, and Harumi Ueko. The song's title reads "Mikeneko Rock", roughly means "Calico/Tortoiseshell Cat Rock".

Miracle Moon ~L.E.D. LIGHT STYLE MIX~
"Miracle Moon ~L.E.D. LIGHT STYLE MIX~" is a song by Togo Project feat. Sana. The song is a remix version from beatmania 5thMix APPEND done by Toshiyuki Kakuta, of a song originally composed by Hiroyuki Togo and sung by Sanae Shintani from beatmania APPEND Gottamix.

MOBO★MOGA
"MOBO★MOGA" is a song by Orange Lounge. The song is a crossover from Dance ManiaX, composed by Tomosuke Funaki and sung by Shizue Tokui, both of which are under the alias "Orange Lounge". The song title means "Modern Boy Modern Girl".

Pink Rose
"Pink Rose" is a song by Kiyommy + Seiya. The song is one of the two only BEMANI crossovers from the now-defunct Keyboardmania series (alongside Frozen Ray), first appearing in Keyboardmania 3rdMix and has since transplanted to many other BEMANI series such as beatmaniaIIDX and pop'n music. Seiya Murai composed this song, with the vocalist Kiyomi Kumano as the vocals. The special background video from Keyboardmania is kept in this game, but did not carried over to future games.

桜
"桜" is a song by RevenG. The song is the Extra Stage of beatmaniaIIDX 8th Style and was composed by Naoki Maeda under the alias RevenG (who frequently used it for his exotic-themed songs). The title reads "Sakura" which means Cherry Blossoms. The song is based on the traditional folk song of Japan called Sakura Sakura. Uniquely, this song is originally conceived as the One More Extra Stage of this game in the location tests. While the idea was eventually scrapped, parts of them are present in the final game, such as the Challenge chart being easier than the Heavy chart (the chart was originally meant to be used for One More Extra Stage) and this song is the only crossover to have a full unique background video.

Scorching Moon
"Scorching Moon" is a song by Shaun the Horny Master.

Senorita (Speedy Mix)
"Senorita (Speedy Mix)" is a song by Jenny Rom.

Speed Over Beethoven
"Speed Over Beethoven" is a song by Rose.  It is a dance mix reimagining of Ludwig van Beethoven's work Für Elise.

STAY (Organic house Version)
"STAY (Organic house Version" is a song by emi. The song is a crossover from Dance ManiaX 2ndMix, composed by Tomosuke Funaki and sung by emi.

stoic (EXTREME version)
"stoic (EXTREME version)" is a song by TaQ. The song is a crossover from beatmaniaIIDX 7th Style and was composed by Taku Sakakibara. The background and background video of the song feature DDR character Afro dressed in a monk suit in a dark background which is actually a reference to the original beatmaniaIIDX video. The "EXTREME version" subtitle signify that this song is a shortened and slightly rearranged version of the original.

sync (EXTREME version)
"sync(EXTREME version)" is a song by OutPhase. The song is a crossover from beatmaniaIIDX 5th Style, composed by Takayuki Ishikawa and Taku Sakakibara under the alias OutPhase. The "EXTREME version" subtitle signify that this song is a shortened and slightly rearranged version of the original.

The Least 100sec
"The Least 100sec" is a song by Hirofumi Sasaki. The song is better known as the Encore Stage of GuitarFreaks 5thMix / Drummania 4thMix and has since been transplanted to many other BEMANI series.

Twin Bee -Generation X-
"Twin Bee -Generation X-" is a song by FinalOffset. The song is a crossover from beatmaniaIII. It is a remix of many songs from one of the earliest Konami game TwinBee, done by Hideaki Sugaya. As a tribute to the series, the banner, background, and background video (replaced with a different video in later games) feature the TwinBee games in action.

Un Deux Trois
"Un Deux Trois" is a Trance song by SDMS.

V ~for EXTREME~
"V ~for EXTREME~" is a song by TAKA. The song is a crossover from beatmaniaIIDX 5th Style and was composed by Takayuki Ishikawa. The song is a modern rendition of Antonio Vivaldi's Concerto No. 4 in F minor, Op. 8, RV 297, "L'inverno (Winter)". In beatmaniaIIDX, this song is known to be the oldest song to have the rating of 12 (the highest difficulty rating) and was considered to be the hardest song for some time. Tran, one of IIDX mascot who appeared in the song's original video also appeared in the background of the song in this game. The "for EXTREME" subtitle signify that this song is a shortened and slightly rearranged version of the original.

We Are the Champions (Factory Team Remix)
"We Are the Champions (Factory Team Remix)" is a song by Live 2 Love.

We Will Rock You
"We Will Rock You" is a song by Houseboyz.

White Lovers
"White Lovers" is a song by 新谷さなえ. The song is a crossover from pop'n music 7, composed by Takayuki Ishikawa and sung by BEMANI vocalist Sanae Shintani. The song itself is actually a remix of a song from pop'n music GB, originally composed by Tomoaki Hirono. The pop'n music character SANAE-chan made appearance in the song banner and video. Like Last Message, this song had not make appearance after this game.

xenon 
"xenon" is a song by Mr.T. The song is better known as the One More Extra Stage of beatmaniaIIDX 8th Style and was composed by Tomoyuki Uchida. The game uses a slightly shorter version than the original.

Music samplers

Dance Dance Revolution Extreme (North America)

Dance Dance Revolution Extreme Limited Edition Music Sampler was released on September 21, 2004 by Konami Digital Entertainment of America in North America. This sampler was only available for pre-orders , typically at a GameStop or EB Games retail outlet. The CD contains tracks taken directly from the game as well as unique remixes done by Konami's in-house artists, from a broad range of musical styles.

Known to Konami as V-RARE SOUNDTRACK-3 USA, the V-RARE moniker had first been used by Konami to release similar albums in Japan to commemorate Bemani game releases there and still are to this date are. In Japan the music CDs are usually bundled with a given game upon release. To date Konami has released 13 V-RARE discs in the US to promote various Dance Dance Revolution game releases and has released them through various video game and non-video game vendors such as GameStop, EB Games, Toys "R" Us, and Burger King.

Dance Dance Revolution Extreme 2 (North America)

Dance Dance Revolution Extreme 2 Limited Edition Music Sampler by Konami Digital Entertainment of America in North America. This sampler was only available for pre-orders , typically at a GameStop or EB Games retail outlet. The CD contains tracks taken directly from the game as well as unique remixes done by Konami's in-house artists, from a broad range of musical styles.

The CD is also known as V-RARE Soundtrack-5 USA. The V-RARE moniker was first used by Konami to release similar video game-based albums in Japan. In Japan these promotional CDs are usually bundled with its corresponding game upon release. As of December 2010, Konami has released 14 V-RARE discs in the US to promote various Dance Dance Revolution games. The latest one was released in 2008 along with Dance Dance Revolution SuperNova 2.

See also 
 List of Dance Dance Revolution songs

Notes

References

External links 
 Konami's official website.
 Music In Every Direction, Konami's official Dance Dance Revolution and music game portal in America.

Dance Dance Revolution Extreme